Aircruising Australia Limited is an airline based in Sydney, Australia. It operates air cruises/sightseeing trips as well as charter flights around Australia and New Zealand. Its main base is Sydney Airport.

The Company was renamed Bill Peach Group in 2014.

History 
The airline was established by Neville Salisbury and started operations in 1983 and was formerly known as Charter Cruise Air until 1994.

Fleet 

The airline no longer operates aircraft directly, chartering them instead from companies including Skytrans Airlines, but in the past years operated Fokker F27 Friendship.

See also
List of airlines of Australia

References

External links
Aircruising Australia

Airlines established in 1983
Australian companies established in 1983
Airlines of Australia
Charter airlines of Australia